

Belgium
Belgian Congo – Eugène Jungers, Governor-General of the Belgian Congo (1947–1951)

France
 French Somaliland – Paul Henri Siriex, Governor of French Somaliland (1946–1950)
 Guinea – 
 Édouard Louis Terrac, Governor of Guinea (1946–1948)
 Roland Pré, Governor of Guinea (1948–1951)

Portugal
 Angola – 
 Temporarily vacant (1947–1948)
 José Agapito de Silva Carvalho, High Commissioner of Angola (1948–1955)

United Kingdom
 Aden – Sir Reginald Stuart Champion, Governor of Aden (1945–1950)
 Malta Colony – Francis Douglas, Governor of Malta (1946–1949)
 Northern Rhodesia 
 Robert Stanley, acting Governor of Northern Rhodesia (1947–1948)
 Sir Gilbert McCall Rennie, Governor of Northern Rhodesia (1948–1954)

Colonial governors
Colonial governors
1948